Aleksi Heino (born 25 July 2004) is a Finnish professional footballer currently playing as a forward for SJK Akatemia.

Club career
Born in Turku, Heino began his career in the academies of Turun Nappulaliigan, TPS and Inter Turku, before trialling with German side VfL Wolfsburg and English side Chelsea in 2020. He signed with the latter in September of the same year.

After a season with Chelsea, in which he only appeared once for the under-18 side, he moved to Germany to join VfL Wolfsburg. However, he also failed to settle in Germany, again notching only one appearance for Wolfsburg's youth side, before a return to Finland with SJK in August 2022.

He scored his first goal for SJK's reserve team, SJK Akatemia, in a 4–3 loss to PK-35 in the 2022 Ykkönen relegation group.

International career
Heino has represented Finland at under-15 and under-18 level.

Career statistics

Club

References

2004 births
Living people
Footballers from Turku
Finnish footballers
Finland youth international footballers
Association football forwards
Ykkönen players
Turun Palloseura footballers
FC Inter Turku players
Chelsea F.C. players
VfL Wolfsburg players
Seinäjoen Jalkapallokerho players
SJK Akatemia players
Finnish expatriate footballers
Finnish expatriate sportspeople in England
Expatriate footballers in England
Finnish expatriate sportspeople in Germany
Expatriate footballers in Germany